USCGC Pamlico may refer to the following United States Coast Guard cutters that are named for Pamlico Sound:
 , a revenue cutter in service from 1907 through 1946. From 1915 to 1946 known as USCGC Pamlico.
 , a 160–foot inland construction tender in service since 1976.

Ships of the United States Revenue Cutter Service
Ships of the United States Coast Guard
Ship names